The Shukhov Tower in Polibino is the world's first diagrid hyperboloid structure designed in 1896 by Russian engineer and architect Vladimir Shukhov. The tower is today located in the former estate of Yury Nechaev-Maltsov in the selo of Polibino in Lipetsk Oblast in Russia.

History
Vladimir Shukhov invented hyperboloid towers and was also the first one to use them in construction. For the 1896 All-Russia industrial and art exhibition in Nizhny Novgorod he built the  steel diagrid tower, which became the first hyperboloid structure in the world. The hyperboloid steel gridshell attracted attention of European observers. In particular, the British magazine The Engineer published an article about the tower.

After the exhibition closed, the openwork tower was bought by a leading glassware manufacturer and art sponsor, Yury Nechaev-Maltsov. It was relocated to his estate in Polibino where it has been preserved until now. The estate is currently under state protection (federal level) as a former property of the Nechayev family.  The estate consists of a palace, English park, regular gardens, ponds, and more.

In the subsequent years, Vladimir Shukhov developed numerous structures of various  hyperboloid steel  gridshells and used them in hundreds of water towers, sea lighthouses, masts of warships and supports for power transmission lines.  Similar hyperboloid structures  appeared abroad only ten years after Shukhov's invention.

See also
List of hyperboloid structures

References

External links
  The research of the Shukhov's world's first hyperboloid structure, Prof. Dr. Armin Grün
Photos of Polibino and vicinities
William Craft Brumfield: "The Origins of Modernism in Russian Architecture", University of California Press, 1991, .
Elizabeth C. English:  "Invention of Hyperboloid Structures", Metropolis & Beyond, 2005.
Elizabeth C. English: “Arkhitektura i mnimosti”: The origins of Soviet avant-garde rationalist architecture in the Russian mystical-philosophical and mathematical intellectual tradition”, a dissertation in architecture, 264 p., University of Pennsylvania, 2000.

Rainer Graefe, Jos Tomlow: “Vladimir G. Suchov 1853–1939. Die Kunst der sparsamen Konstruktion.”, 192 S., Deutsche Verlags-Anstalt, Stuttgart, 1990, .

Fausto Giovannardi: "Vladimir G. Shukhov e la leggerezza dell’acciaio", Borgo San Lorenzo, 2007.

Photos

Lattice shell structures by Vladimir Shukhov
Hyperboloid structures
Objects of cultural heritage of Russia of federal significance
Cultural heritage monuments in Lipetsk Oblast